Yeima Torres Beltrán (born 31 July 1987) is a Cuban professional racing cyclist, who most recently rode for UCI Women's Continental Team . In June 2019, she finished third in the women's time trial event at the Cuban National Road Championships.

References

External links

1987 births
Living people
Cuban female cyclists
Place of birth missing (living people)
21st-century Cuban women
Competitors at the 2006 Central American and Caribbean Games